The Gütsch Funicular, also known as the Drahtseilbahn Gütsch (DBG) or simply the Gütschbahn, is a funicular railway in the city of Lucerne in the Swiss canton of Lucerne.

The Château Gütsch was constructed between 1881 and 1883 on a site overlooking the city of Lucerne and modelled on the architecture of Neuschwanstein Castle in Bavaria. In order to link the hotel to the city, the water-powered Gütschbahn funicular was opened on 22 August 1884. The line continued operating until 21 April 2008, when service ceased until further notice. After rebuilding, the line reopened on 26 September 2015.

In its current guise the line is operated by Verkehrsbetriebe Luzern, the city's transport operator, and is integrated into zone 10 of the city's integrated fare system. It has the following parameters:

See also
List of funicular railways

Gallery

References

External links

Funicular railways in Switzerland
Transport in Lucerne